Chiapadytes bolivari is a species of beetle in the family Carabidae, the only species in the genus Chiapadytes.

References

Trechinae